Christopher Paul MacDonald  (born 8 January 1960) is a New Zealand sprint canoeist who competed from the mid-1980s to the early 1990s. He is widely regarded as one of New Zealand's most successful international athletes and holds innumerable international speed records in canoeing.

Competing in three Summer Olympics, MacDonald won five medals. This included three golds (K-2 500 m: 1984, 1988; K-4 1000 m: 1984), one silver (K-2 1000 m: 1988), and one bronze (K-1 500 m: 1988). His five Olympic medals is the record for the second most Olympic medals won by a New Zealander, a record he shares with fellow canoeist Ian Ferguson, and equestrian Mark Todd.

He also won six medals at the ICF Canoe Sprint World Championships with three golds (K-1 500 m: 1987, K-2 500 m: 1985, K-2 1000 m: 1987) and three silvers (K-2 500 m: 1982, 1987, K-2 10000 m: 1990).

In retirement from professional competition, MacDonald has produced many television sports events and programmes including Clash of the Codes (the ultimate sporting challenge) and annually presents the Dragon Boat Festival.

In the 1988 New Year Honours, MacDonald was appointed a Member of the Order of the British Empire, for services to canoeing.

References

External links
 
 
 Biography at New Zealand Olympic Committee
 
 
 

1960 births
Canoeists at the 1984 Summer Olympics
Canoeists at the 1988 Summer Olympics
Canoeists at the 1992 Summer Olympics
Living people
New Zealand male canoeists
Olympic canoeists of New Zealand
Olympic gold medalists for New Zealand
Olympic silver medalists for New Zealand
Olympic bronze medalists for New Zealand
Olympic medalists in canoeing
New Zealand Members of the Order of the British Empire
ICF Canoe Sprint World Championships medalists in kayak
Medalists at the 1988 Summer Olympics
Medalists at the 1984 Summer Olympics